Ohr Torah Stone (OTS) is an international Modern Orthodox movement that aims to develop Jewish life, learning, and leadership. The organization is led by  Rabbi Dr. Kenneth Brander. In 1983 OTS was founded by Rabbi Dr. Shlomo Riskin.  As of 2020 OTS included 27 educational institutions under its auspices.

The organization also includes a network of 300-plus emissaries who serve in positions of spiritual and educational leadership across the globe in North America, South America, Central America, Australia, and New Zealand.
OTS has initiated numerous programs in the realm of women's leadership and empowerment, leadership training, Jewish outreach, and social action, which have received both national and international acclaim for their groundbreaking nature. OTS has stated that its primary guiding principle is to ensure the accessibility of Judaism to every Jew—particularly addressing populations which had been previously marginalized, disenfranchised or alienated.

Jewish women's empowerment

OTS's programs for women have opened doors in the realm of Jewish Orthodox female scholarship and leadership that had previously been shut to the entire female population. OTS started the first school to teach post-high school women Talmud on a high level. OTS’s women’s college features the largest women’s beit midrash [study hall] in Jewish history. The college has produced female leaders of Jewish communities worldwide, including the first female to officially serve as the director of a rabbinical court.

OTS's women's college developed a program specifically for women with special needs. The curriculum allows participants to acquire both learning and vocational skills, build independence, and improve self-esteem while expanding their love of Torah, Israel, and the Jewish people. The program had proven so successful that in 2017, a parallel program was established for young men.

Another OTS program enables religious women to serve in the Israeli army. Previously, Israeli women were forced to choose between service to their country and an observant lifestyle. By way of the program, female participants are inducted as a group and strengthened by intense study before, during, and after their service.

OTS also opened the first school in the world to train, certify, and ordain women as heter hora’ah, or "permission to make Halachic decisions," for service in the rabbinical courts. Only because of OTS’s appeal to the Israeli Supreme Court did women win the legal right to practice in the courts–an arena that was previously open only to men.  The school then opened a Legal Aid Center and Hotline for Israeli women who are agunot (The agunah is a woman literally “chained” to a dead or abusive marriage whose husband refuses to grant her a Jewish writ of divorce) and need free advice and legal representation in matters pertaining to the process of obtaining a religious divorce.

Contemporary Jewish leadership
Ohr Torah Stone’s Rabbinical Seminary prepares rabbis to be both fluent in secular learning as well as the Talmud. The curriculum is geared toward contemporary concerns as well as Jewish law and legal texts. At the same time, the OTS Educators Institute comprehensively trains educators to teach Judaic Studies in both Orthodox and non-Orthodox state and community schools across Israel and the Diaspora.

An additional OTS yeshiva is geared toward young men both with and without previous yeshiva backgrounds from North America, Europe, South Africa, and Australia.

Hundreds of OTS-trained teachers and spiritual leaders have served in communities spanning the globe.

Many of the OTS graduates have joined the ranks of OTS-trained Jewish Cultural Facilitators who provide formal and informal Jewish education for Israelis of all ages and backgrounds. This initiative works in conjunction with Israeli Community Centers. Media coverage has reported that these facilitators actively promote Jewish values, national unity, and heritage awareness in a non-coercive environment.

OTS high schools

OTS has established 6 modern Orthodox high schools within the Jerusalem and Gush Etzion regions. All of these high schools offer official matriculation and have been awarded the recognition of excellence from the Israeli Ministry of Education.

OTS around the world

Each year, OTS sends spiritual and educational leaders to serve as emissaries in Jewish communities all over the world. These emissaries are active in synagogues, campuses and schools, and Jewish communities across the globe.

Schools and programs

Programs for men

 Joseph and Gwendolyn Straus Rabbinical Seminary
 	Robert M. Beren College
 	Robert M. Beren Machanaim Hesder Yeshiva
 	OTS Metivta, Carmiel
 	Elaine And Norm Brodsky Darkaynu Program

Programs for women

 Midreshet Lindenbaum College for Women, Jerusalem
 	Midreshet Lindenbaum-Lod
 	Midreshet Lindenbaum-Matat, Carmiel
 	Yad La’isha: The Monica Dennis Goldberg Legal Aid Center And Hotline For Women

Emissary programs

 Beren-Amiel Educational Emissaries
 	Claudia Cohen Women Educators Institute
 	Maarava – Rabbinic Emissaries to Sephardic Communities
 	Straus-Amiel Rabbinic Emissaries
 	OTS Amiel BaKehila
 	Ohr Torah Nidchei Yisrael
 	Yachad Program for Jewish Identity

Junior high and high schools

 Derech Avot Junior High and High School for Boys, Efrat
 	Jacob Sapirstein Junior High and High School For Boys, Ramot, Jerusalem
 	Jennie Sapirstein Junior High and High School For Girls, Ramot, Jerusalem
 	Neveh Channah High School for Girls, In Memory Of Anna Ehrman, Gush Etzion
 	Neveh Shmuel Yeshiva High School for Boys, In Memory Of Samuel Pinchas Ehrman, Efrat
 	Oriya Girls' High School, Gush Etzion
 	Ann Belsky Moranis Program For Arts And Drama

Conversion programs
       Conversion Institute for Spanish Speakers - Efrat, Israel
 	Jewish Learning Center - New York

International programs
       Hertog Center for Jewish-Christian Understanding And Cooperation (CJCUC)
 	OMEK - A Transformative Learning and Touring Experience in Israel

Further reading
Rabbi Shlomo Riskin
Rabbi Kenneth Brander
Midreshet Lindenbaum
Center for Jewish–Christian Understanding and Cooperation (CJCUC)

References

External links

 

Educational institutions established in 1983
Jewish organizations based in Israel
Educational organizations based in Israel
Jewish education in Israel
Education in Israel
International educational organizations
Jewish movements
Jewish educational institutions
Jewish educational organizations
Orthodox Jewish educational institutions
1983 establishments in Israel